Echols is an unincorporated community and coal town located in Ohio County, Kentucky, United States. It was also known as Pink Hall.

The town extends north from Pardise, and also north from the Peabody Wildlife Management which used to be coal mines.

Echols was established as a coal town in 1874 and named for the mine owner.

References

Unincorporated communities in Ohio County, Kentucky
Unincorporated communities in Kentucky
Coal towns in Kentucky